Protitame is a genus of moths in the family Geometridae erected by James Halliday McDunnough in 1939.

Species
The following species are classified in the genus. This list is likely incomplete.

Protitame virginalis (Hulst, 1900) – virgin moth
Protitame subalbaria (Packard, 1873)
Protitame cervula (Rindge, 1958)

References

Abraxini
Taxa named by James Halliday McDunnough